Bull Creek is the largest Eel River tributary drainage basin preserved within Humboldt Redwoods State Park. The basin contains the world's largest remaining contiguous old-growth forest of coast redwoods.

Old-growth forest 
The forest that grows in the alluvial flats along Bull Creek contain the highest recorded biomass of any forest in the world. This forest also has as the world's highest canopy—as measured by the average height of the mature trees. The average height of canopy trees along Bull Creek exceeds , and several trees in this forest exceed .

The forest canopy is dominated by mature coast redwoods, many of which are over 1000 years old. Smaller populations of Tanoak, California laurel, and Douglas fir are present alongside the creek itself and in gaps in the canopy. Because of the dense canopy, very little light reaches the ground, which is covered primarily by a carpet of shade-tolerant Redwood sorrel.

The Bull Creek forest contains several of the world's largest and tallest trees, including the Stratosphere Giant, which was the tallest known tree in the world between its discovery in 2000 and 2006, and the Bull Creek Giant, the largest tree in Humboldt Redwoods State Park.

History

Early attempts to preserve individual redwood trees and small groves of trees led to an improved understanding of the interdependence of forest ecosystems. Species important to the centuries-old coastal redwood trees include aquatic plants and animals within adjacent streams. The entire Bull Creek drainage basin is protected within park boundaries to avoid upstream water quality changes detrimental to aquatic residents of the floodplain where the largest trees grow. Redwood trees control the rate of erosion within the drainage basin. Large-diameter, rot-resistant trunks of fallen redwood trees may resist erosion more effectively than the friable upper Cretaceous marine sedimentary and metasedimentary bedrock of the drainage basin.

Founders Grove on the Bull Creek flood plain was within  purchased in 1931 by the Save the Redwoods League. Timber on land upslope of Founders Grove was harvested in 1947. Four hundred more large trees were felled from the grove by the Christmas flood of 1964. Most of the remainder of the Bull Creek watershed was subsequently purchased by Save-the-Redwoods League to encourage upslope forest management practices more similar to natural processes.

References

See also
List of rivers in California

Rivers of Humboldt County, California
Rivers of Northern California
Tributaries of the Eel River (California)
State parks of California
Old-growth forests
Coast redwood groves